Melvin Jerome "Rome" Brown (born July 6, 1967) is an American chef who has worked for Colin Powell, Carl XVI Gustaf of Sweden, Cam Newton, Nancy Kerrigan, Priscilla Presley, and was personal chef to Shaquille O'Neal. His expertise is in Southern United States cuisine.

In 1986 he enlisted in the United States Army as a cook and later was the area chef at Disney's Contemporary Resort.

Personal life
Brown was born and raised in Newark, New Jersey and currently lives in Rocky Mount, North Carolina. He has two children Jasmine and Joshua who appeared with him on The 700 Club in 2007.

Publications 
Brown has authored two cookbooks: Eat Like A Celebrity: Southern Cuisine with a Gourmet Twist (released December 2013) and Carolina Soul: The down home taste of the Carolinas released (April 10, 2018). His first cookbook Eat Like A Celebrity: Southern Cuisine with a Gourmet Twist, was awarded 2014 Cookbook of the Year at the African American Literary Awards Show.

Television 
Brown has cooked for many celebrities and heads of state, including Shaquille O'Neal and the current King of Sweden.  He has also made television appearances as a competitor on Extreme Chef on the Food Network, two appearances on The 700 Club where he was interviewed by Pat Robertson, and I've Got Skills on ESPN.

References

External links

1967 births
Living people
People from Newark, New Jersey
American chefs
American male chefs
American food writers